Margaret Winser (1868 – 29 December 1944) was an English sculptor, medallist, artist, and art teacher.

Life and works
Margaret Winser was born at Rolvenden near Tenterdenin Kent during 1868, the daughter of Albert Winser, a farmer, and Mary Jane Winser. She began working as an assistant art teacher around 1891 and studied at the Dover School of Art, winning a number of National Competition awards. At some time she was a pupil of Auguste Rodin

Naval Good Shooting and General Service Medals
In February 1904, the Royal Mint invited students of the Modelling School of the Royal College of Art in South Kensington, London, to suggest designs for the reverse of the newly established Naval Good Shooting Medal. Winser's entry was selected and used, with the dies engraved by G. W. De Saulles. Although awards of the Naval Good Shooting Medal were discontinued in 1914, Winser's design is still used for the reverse of the Queen's Medal for Champion Shots for both the Royal Navy and the New Zealand Naval Forces.

Winser also designed the reverse of the Naval General Service Medal, instituted in August 1915 and awarded for minor Royal Navy campaigns until 1962.

Hastings War Memorial
After the First World War Winser was commissioned to design the Hastings and St Leonards War Memorial in Alexandra Park, Hastings. This included a bronze winged figure of victory and three bronze panels, depicting soldiers, sailors and airmen on active service. The memorial was dedicated on Sunday 26 March 1922.

Her design for the memorial to the 17 lifeboatman drowned in the 1928 Rye lifeboat disaster was approved by the men’s relatives, but was not finally used.

Ellen Terry and Smallhythe Place
Smallhythe Place, near Tenterden was bought by the actress Dame Ellen Terry in 1899, and was her main residence in her later years. Winser, who lived close by and who was a visitor to the house, produced a plaster medallion relief of Terry in 1913. Dame Ellen died at home on 21 July 1928 aged 81, in the presence of her daughter and son. The next day, Winser was invited to Smallhythe Place and made a mould of Ellen Terry's face, from which she produced four death masks. Of these, two remain at Smallhythe Place, one was given to Shakespeare Memorial Theatre in Stratford-upon-Avon in 1933 and the fourth was presented to the National Portrait Gallery, London in 1949. Two plaster casts of Terry's hands, were also made, probably by Winser, who also produced a bust of Ellen Terry based on these posthumous casts.

The plaster medallion, death mask and posthumous bust, along with a relief plaque of the Hastings War Memorial that she designed, remain in the collection at Smallhythe Place, which is now a museum run by the National Trust.

Other works
During her career, Winser created a large number of memorial plaques, statues and portrait medallions, including one of the violinist Joseph Joachim. From 1904 to 1929 she regularly exhibited at the Royal Academy in London, mainly as a sculptor of portrait and other medallions. She was one of the female sculptors that the Royal Society of British Sculptors considered including in the Franco-British Exhibition of Science, Art and Industries held in London in 1908. Other work included providing the illustrations for a book 'Lays and Legends of the Weald of Kent' written by her sister Lilian Winser, published in 1897.

She continued to live near Tenterden in Kent for most of her life, dying on 29 December 1944, aged 76.

Examples of Winser's work 
These are examples of her drawing and sculpture.

References

External links

 Biographical Dictionary of Medallists Volume VI, pages 153–4 Compiled by L. Forrer. Spink & Son Ltd, 1916
 Artwork by Margaret Winser held by the National Trust at Smallhythe Place, Kent
 Plaster cast of death mask of Ellen Terry by Margaret Winser National Portrait Gallery
 Royal Academy of Arts: Exhibition catalogues mentioning Margaret Winser

1868 births
1944 deaths
19th-century British sculptors
19th-century English women artists
20th-century British sculptors
20th-century English women artists
Artists from Kent
English women sculptors
People from Tenterden